At the Soundless Dawn is Red Sparowes' 2005 debut release. It had a mixed reception upon release, enthusiastically welcomed by fans of the genre and of related bands such as Isis and Neurosis. Belgian record label Hypertension Records released it on double LP.

The album includes no vocals, instead focusing on extended instrumentation evolving slowly, usually into a crescendo. This would make the album best described as post rock. Throughout the album, the motifs of urban decay and human extinction are expressed via samples, and the poetic nature of the song titles.

Theme 
According to the band, "There is an underlying theme to this record. The literature on the subject is almost limitless, but it basically breaks down to this: There have previously been five “mass extinction events” on earth that have been scientifically realized, dating back from 440 million years ago. These events have resulted in the extinction of 19% - 54% of all species on earth at each specific time period. The first five events have been caused by natural elements, including the known impacts with meteors and the like. We are currently experiencing the sixth extinction event, which is the first one to be caused by a single species on our planet, which happens to be humanity."

It has been also postulated that a major inspiration of the album is T. S. Eliot's Preludes, as "the original idea of using the word 'sparrows' came from the words of T. S. Eliot", and it is within Preludes that the sparrow is referenced, as a symbol of mankind's abuse of nature. "Sunlight Through the Shutters", from the final song, is a recurring image in Eliot's work; notably "And the light crept up between the shutters, And you heard the sparrows in the gutters" from "Preludes" part III, line 31. The theme of mankind's destruction of nature is concordant with the concept pressing forward the album also.

Track listing 

 

The eighth track, "I Saw the Sky in the North Open to the Ground and Fire Poured Out", was initially only available on Japanese releases of the album. It was later released in the United States on a split EP with Gregor Samsa.

Personnel 

Band members
 Dana Berkowitz – drums
 Greg Burns – bass, pedal steel
 Jeff Caxide – guitar, bass guitar
 Josh Graham – guitar, piano, album artwork
 Bryant Clifford Meyer – guitar, organ

Other personnel
 Bill Dooley – mastering
 Desmond Shea – recording

References 

Concept albums
2005 albums
Post-metal albums
Red Sparowes albums
Hypertension Records albums